Balatonfőkajár is a village in Veszprém county, Hungary.

People 
 Stern family, ancestor of Georg Solti

External links 
 The history of Balatonfőkajár
  Street map

Populated places in Veszprém County
Shtetls